Ethan Takudzwa Kachosa (born 23 January 2003) is an English professional footballer who plays as a defender for EFL Championship side Sunderland.

Early life

Kachosa was born in Leeds, West Yorkshire to a Zimbabwean family and attended Garforth Academy. He joined his local side Leeds United where he signed a two-year scholarship in 2019 after winning the Academy's Players' Player of the Year award. He featured for the under-21s team in September 2020, during a 0–7 defeat to League One side Accrington Stanley in the Football League Trophy, but failed to win a professional contract with the Premier League side and was released at the end of the 2020–21 season.

Club career

Kachosa signed for Sunderland in the summer of 2021 following his release from Leeds, signing a two year professional deal. He made his professional debut on the 13th October in a 2–1 win over Manchester United's under-21's side in the Football League Trophy, replacing captain Denver Hume as a substitute in the 71st minute.

International career

Kachosa is eligible to play for his country of birth England or Zimbabwe through his family. He is yet to commit to either country.

Career statistics

References

2003 births
Living people
Footballers from Leeds
English footballers
English people of Zimbabwean descent
Sunderland A.F.C. players
Association football defenders